Dwight H. Perkins may refer to:

 Dwight H. Perkins (architect) (1867–1941), American architect and planner
 Dwight H. Perkins (economist) (born 1934), American economist